Gloria Davis may refer to:

People
Major Gloria D. Davis (1959–2006) US Army officer found dead after describing financial improprieties in Iraq
Gloria Davis (politician), member of the New York State Assembly, convicted of financial impropriety in 2003

Fictional characters
Gloria Davis, character in Cannibal Ferox
Gloria Davis, character in Lullaby of Broadway (film)

See also
Gloria Davy, Swiss singer